The Mount Kaputar National Park is a national park located in New South Wales, Australia, surrounding the proximities of Mount Kaputar, a volcano active between 17 and 21 million years ago. Millions of years of erosion have since carved the volcanic region into the lava terraces, volcanic plugs, and dykes of Nandewar Range.

The park protects a wide range of biomes, including semi-arid woodland, subalpine heath, and eucalypt forests, and provides a habitat for a range of animals, including bats, birds, wallabies, quolls, and the unique red triangle slug (Triboniophorus graeffei), which is known to appear after rainfall.

History
Before it was a national park, the area was used largely as grazing land for domestic animals. The conditions in the park are very harsh, but several pioneering families lived there, and remnants of their occupation remain. Sheep and cattle continued to graze on the plateau until around the 1950s. It was an isolated place, and the stockmen in charge of the cattle often would not see another human for months at a time.

Two years later, a trust, known as the Mount Kaputar Trust, was formed to give guidance on managing the park. Eight years later, in 1967, the Fund relinquished the duties of controlling the park to the newly established National Parks and Wildlife Service, and the park is still administered by a regional advisory board.

Facilities and activities
In 1965, two cabins were constructed at Dawsons Spring, providing accommodations including a permanent water supply for showers and toilets, and a picnic facility. Today there are 3 cabins, including the one facilitated from Bark Hut.

The park is popular with rockclimbers, and there are 11 walks in the park, as well as a camping ground. However, the most popular site in the park is Scutts Hut, located upward of Kurrawonga Falls. The hut is the former home of the Scutt family, a pioneer family living in the vicinity of the park. it is accessible via a fire trail from the Bark Hut camping grounds. The hut has been restored to its original livery, with an earthen floor and an open fireplace. The hut is built on the banks of Horsearm Creek, which flows into Kurrawonga Falls.

See also
 Protected areas of New South Wales

References

External links

National parks of New South Wales
Protected areas established in 1967
1959 establishments in Australia
North West Slopes
Volcanism of Australia